In enzymology, an Oplophorus-luciferin 2-monooxygenase, also known as Oplophorus luciferase (referred in this article as OpLuc) is a luciferase, an enzyme, from the deep-sea shrimp Oplophorus gracilirostris [2], belonging to a group of coelenterazine luciferases. Unlike other luciferases, it has a broader substrate specificity [3,4,6] and can also bind to bisdeoxycoelenterazine efficiently [3,4]. It is the third example of a luciferase (Other than Aequorea and Renilla) to be purified in lab [2]. The systematic name of this enzyme class is Oplophorus-luciferin:oxygen 2-oxidoreductase (decarboxylating). This enzyme is also called Oplophorus luciferase.

Chemical reaction 
The two substrates of this enzyme are the luciferin, Coelenterazine and O2 and its 3 products are the oxyluciferin, Coelenteramide, CO2, and light.
This enzyme belongs to the family of oxidoreductases, specifically those acting on single donors with O2 as oxidant and incorporation of two atoms of oxygen into the substrate (oxygenases). The oxygen incorporated need not be derived from O with incorporation of one atom of oxygen (internal monooxygenases o internal mixed-function oxidases). Although the enzyme is part of the group of enzymes that act on coelenterazine, such as Renilla and Gaussia luciferases, it does not share base pair sequences with these enzymes [3,4,5,7].

OpLuc catalyzes the ATP independent chemical reaction [3,4,5,6]:

coelenterazine (Oplophorus luciferin)  + O2  coelenteramide + CO2 + hν

This reaction has an optimal pH of 9, optimal salt concentration of 0.05-0.1 M, and optimal temperature of ~40 C (making it an unusually heat resistant luciferase) [2], although because O.gracilirostris are deep sea animals living in below 20 C temperatures, luciferase is normally expressed and folded at low temperatures [6].

Biological Function 
When stimulated in Oplophorus gracilirostris, OpLuc is secreted from the base of legs and antennae of the deep-sea shrimp as a defense mechanism. This mechanism causes O.gracilirostris release a luminous, bright blue luciferase cloud [2].

Enzyme Pathway 
The small protein subunit of OpLuc, 19kda, has an amino terminal peptide sequence that, when stimulated, signals the enzyme to bind to the coelenterazine, Oplophorus luciferin (the substrate) [3,7]. Shown in figure 1,the enzyme then oxidizes the coelenterazine in a water medium into the luminescent product, coelenteramide, and releases  as a byproduct [2,3,7].

Structure 
OpLuc is a complex of two covalently bonded [3] protein subunits: two molecules of 19 kDa and two molecules of 35 kDa components, making it a heterotetrameric molecule. The proteins signal the enzyme for secretion in luminescence, catalyzed by the protein 19 kDa [3,4,7]. The luciferase has many cysteine residues that stabilize the enzyme in extracellular environments using disulfide bonds [5].

19 kDa Protein 
This catalytic component of OpLuc has 196 amino acids [3] with one cysteine in the carboxyl terminus and is distinct from proteins found in other luciferases [4]. The protein is made up of two domains with repetitive sequencing of Ia-c and Ila-d in the peptide chain [4]. It is thought to be the protein to cause the bioluminescent reaction of O.gracilirostris, but functions ineffectively without its larger, subunit counterpart [3,4]. Although the crystal structure of OpLec has yet to be completely analyzed and mapped, 19 kDa experimentally expressed in mammalian cells (regarded as KAZ [7]). The protein was isolated and mutated to catalyze a bright and sustained luminescent reaction to create an engineered luciferase, NanoLuc (NLuc), and a coelenterazine analogue (furimazine) to be used as a cellular reporter [5,8]. A mutated ribbon model of the 19 kDa protein (named nanoKaz) is shown in figure 2.

35 kDa Protein 
The lesser known component of the OpLuc enzyme has 320 amino acids [3] with 11 cysteine and 5 leucine molecules [4]. The amino terminus of the protein was experimentally concluded to begin at 39 amino acids [3].  It is thought to stabilize 19 kDa and is not thought to be affect by substrate specificity [3], however its exact function is not known [3,4,7].

Mechanism 
Although originally thought to have the exact same mechanism as the Renilla luciferase [1], this luminescence has two possible reaction routes [2], as shown in figure 3. In the top route, Oplophorus luciferin (the coelenterazine displayed as I in the scheme) is oxidized when it combines with O2(radioactively labelled O18 was used in lab experiment) in a water medium and uses a dioxetane peroxide intermediate resulting in a  product and coelenteramide (II in the scheme). The lower pathway does not use an intermediate and has rapid exchanges of oxygen with the water medium. Studies show there is less product yield and is suggested to have partial involvement in the overall reaction [2]. It should be noted, however, it is likely  contamination during experiments demonstrated higher yield than was occurring for the lower pathway, making this pathway highly unlikely in natural conditions [2].

References 

 DeLuca, M., Dempsey, M. E., Hori, K., Wampler, J. E., & Cormier, M. J. (1971). Mechanism of oxidative carbon dioxide production during Renilla reniformis bioluminescence. Proceedings of the National Academy of Sciences, 68(7), 1658-1660.
 
 
 Inouye, S., & Sasaki, S. (2007). Overexpression, purification and characterization of the catalytic component of Oplophorus luciferase in the deep-sea shrimp, Oplophorus gracilirostris. Protein expression and purification, 56(2), 261-268.
 Hall, M. P., Unch, J., Binkowski, B. F., Valley, M. P., Butler, B. L., Wood, M. G., ... & Robers, M. B. (2012). Engineered luciferase reporter from a deep sea shrimp utilizing a novel imidazopyrazinone substrate. ACS chemical biology, 7(11), 1848-1857
 Inouye, S., Sahara-Miura, Y., Sato, J. I., Iimori, R., Yoshida, S., & Hosoya, T. (2012). Expression, purification and luminescence properties of coelenterazine-utilizing luciferases from Renilla, Oplophorus and Gaussia: comparison of substrate specificity for C2-modified coelenterazines. Protein Expression and Purification, 88(1), 150-156.
 Inouye, S., Sato, J. I., Sahara-Miura, Y., Hosoya, T., & Suzuki, T. (2014). Unconventional secretion of the mutated 19 kDa protein of Oplophorus luciferase (nanoKAZ) in mammalian cells. Biochemical and biophysical research communications, 450(4), 1313-1319.
 Tomabechi, Y., Hosoya, T., Ehara, H., Sekine, S. I., Shirouzu, M., & Inouye, S. (2016). Crystal structure of nanoKAZ: The mutated 19 kDa component of Oplophorus luciferase catalyzing the bioluminescent reaction with coelenterazine. Biochemical and biophysical research communications, 470(1), 88-93.

EC 1.13.12
Enzymes of unknown structure